Walter James (June 3, 1882 – June 27, 1946) was an American character actor.  He appeared in more than 50 films between 1915 and 1942. He was born in Chattanooga, Tennessee, and died in Gardena, California from a heart attack.

Partial filmography

 The Unbroken Road (1915)
 A Daughter of the Gods (1916) - Chief Eunuch
 Souls Adrift (1917) - A Swede Sailor
 The Idol Dancer (1920) - Chief Wando
 Dead Men Tell No Tales (1920) - José
 Fair Lady (1922) - Gian Norcone
 The Secrets of Paris (1922) - The Strangler
 Two Shall Be Born (1924) - Hund
 The Monster (1925) - Caliban
 The Everlasting Whisper (1925) - Aswin Brody
 Little Annie Rooney (1925) - Officer Rooney
 The Seventh Bandit (1926) - Ben Goring
 Glenister of the Mounted (1926) - Thorald
 Battling Butler (1926) - The Mountain Girl's Father
 The Kid Brother (1927) - Jim Hickory
 Rich Men's Sons (1927) - Clerk (uncredited)
 The Blood Ship (1927) - Capt. Angus Swope
 The Patent Leather Kid (1927) - Officer Riley
 The Irresistible Lover (1927) - Mr. Kennedy
 The Road to Ruin (1928) - Headwaiter (uncredited)
 The Big Killing (1928) - Sheriff
 The Wright Idea (1928) - Capt. Sandy
 Me, Gangster (1928) - Police Capt. Dodd
 The Divine Lady (1929) - One of Nelson's Ship's Officers (uncredited)
 Hell's Heroes (1929) - Sheriff
 Shadow of the Law (1930) - Captain of the Guards
 The Public Defender (1931) - Police Captain Anderson (uncredited)
 Street Scene (1931) - Police Marshal James Henry
 Scareheads (1931)
 Docks of San Francisco (1932) - Phony Café Waiter (uncredited)
 Police Court (1932) - Cappy Hearn
 Ann Vickers (1933) - Guard (uncredited)
 Hips, Hips, Hooray! (1934) - Mountaineer (uncredited)
 No More Women (1934) - Bouncer (uncredited)
 The Road to Ruin (1934) - Headwaiter (uncredited)
 The Cat's-Paw (1934) - Nightclub Doorman (uncredited)
 Jealousy (1934) - Cop (uncredited)
 Arizona Bad Man (1935) - Jack - Bartender
 The Public Menace (1935) - Policeman (uncredited)
 Hitch Hike Lady (1935) - Chief of Police (uncredited)
 Custer's Last Stand (1936, Serial) - Judge Hooker [Chs.12-14]
 Riffraff (1936) - Townsman (uncredited)
 Modern Times (1936) - Assembly Line Foreman (uncredited)
 White Fang (1936) - Posse Member (uncredited)
 Oh, Susanna! (1936) - Sage City Sheriff Briggs
 California Mail (1936) - Man Who Bets $1000 (uncredited)
 Mountain Justice (1937) - Juror (uncredited)
 This Is My Affair (1937) - Dinner Guest (uncredited)
 The Lone Ranger (1938, Serial) - Joe Cannon (Ch. 11) (uncredited)
 Professor Beware (1938) - Man with New Hat (uncredited)
 Disbarred (1939) - Juror (uncredited)
 Eternally Yours (1939) - Police Official (uncredited)
 Invisible Stripes (1939) - Worker (uncredited)
 Legion of the Lawless (1940) - Vigilante at Meeting (uncredited)
 The Kid's Last Ride (1941) - Bartender (uncredited)
 Citizen Kane (1941) - Ward Heeler (uncredited)
 The Lone Rider Fights Back (1941) - Bartender (uncredited)
 The Panther's Claw (1942) - Capt. Tom Henry
 Good Luck, Mr. Yates (1943) - Leading Citizen (uncredited)

External links

1882 births
1946 deaths
American male film actors
American male silent film actors
Male actors from Tennessee
20th-century American male actors